The Harrowing may refer to
"The Harrowing" (Inside No. 9), a 2014 episode of British dark comedy series Inside No. 9
The Harrowing (novel), a 2006 novel by Alexandra Sokoloff
The Harrowing, a 2016 novel by James Aitcheson 
The Harrowing of Hell, in Christian theology
 The Harrowing (novel), a 2020 novel by RW Duder